Linda Yasmine Posio (born 1974) is a Swedish politician and former member of the Riksdag, the national legislature. A member of the Left Party, she represented Gothenburg Municipality between June 2017 and September 2022.

Posio is the daughter of carpenter Esa Mertala and administrator Marja-Leena Posio. She trained to be a teacher. She has held numerous jobs including caretaker, kitchen assistant, au-pair, warehouse worker, truck driver and teacher. She was a member of the municipal council in Gothenburg Municipality from 2014 to 2017.

References

1974 births
Living people
Members of the Riksdag 2014–2018
Members of the Riksdag 2018–2022
Members of the Riksdag from the Left Party (Sweden)
People from Gothenburg
Women members of the Riksdag
21st-century Swedish women politicians